Stent is a surname. Notable people with the surname include:

 Peter Stent (c. 1642 – 1665), London printmaker and seller
 Charles Stent (1807–1885), English dentist for whom the medical stent is named
 Sydney Margaret Stent (1875–1942), South African botanist
 Gunther Stent (1924–2008), German-American molecular geneticist
 Angela Stent (born 1947), American foreign-affairs educator
 Mark Stent (born 1965), British record producer, engineer, and mixer a.k.a. "Spike" Stent